Berkadzor is a village de facto in the Askeran Province of the breakaway Republic of Artsakh, de jure in the Khojaly District of Azerbaijan, in the disputed region of Nagorno-Karabakh. The village has an ethnic Armenian-majority population, and was founded in 1998.

Toponymy 
The village is also known as Armenabad.

History 
During the Soviet period, the area around the village was a part of the Askeran District of the Nagorno-Karabakh Autonomous Oblast.

Historical heritage sites 
Historical heritage sites in and around the village include tombs from the 2nd–1st millennia BCE.

Economy and culture 
The population is mainly engaged in agriculture and animal husbandry, as well as in different state institutions. As of 2015, the village has a municipal building, a house of culture, a school, two shops, and a medical centre.

Demographics 
The village had 165 inhabitants in 2005, and 195 inhabitants in 2015.

References

External links 
 

Populated places in Askeran Province
Populated places in Khojaly District